Shobha Warrier is an Indian journalist and author based in Chennai. She began her career as a creative writer, with publishing a number of short stories in Malayalam: "Ramakundam", "Meghana", and "Jalavidya". In 1996, she was awarded with the Lalithambika Sahitya Awards (named after the author and social reformer Lalithambika Antharjanam) for the lattermost, which was later translated to Kannada and Telugu. Warrier, however, felt that she did not receive any recognition with the work and subsequently became a journalist after getting persuasion from her friends. She is serving as the associate editorial director of the entertainment website Rediff.com.

Writing career 
Warrier has authored four books, all of which were published by Vitasta Publishing. The first is The Diary of A Journalist: The Little Flower Girl and Others (2013), an anthological book containing 36 stories about her meeting with several people during her journalistic career. The idea of the book first came up while she was visiting an ashram for children with HIV. She next wrote His Days with Bapu Gandhi's Personal Secretary Recalls (2016), chronicling the life of Mahatma Gandhi. Dreamchasers: Entrepreneurs from the South of the Vindhyas came as her third book and was released in 2017. Dreamchasers: Women Entrepreneurs from the South of the Vindhyas (2018) is her fourth book, which details about a total of 14 women entrepreneurs. The book's development started in 1997 after Warrier met the academic Ashok Jhunjhunwala. She told a Hindu interviewer, "I was drawn to it because of Jhunjhunwala. He had an incubation centre at [the Indian Institute of Technology Madras] long before we started using terms like ‘startup’. When I interviewed him, he spoke about the centre and wanted me to meet a few entrepreneurs."

Bibliography

References 

Indian women journalists
Indian women writers
Living people
Year of birth missing (living people)